Night Games is a 1966 Swedish movie directed by Mai Zetterling and starring Ingrid Thulin. The film premiered at the 27th Venice International Film Festival where it was considered so controversial that it was shown to the jury in private. The film was also the cause of former child-star Shirley Temple's resignation from the San Francisco International Film Festival.  Temple denounced the film as “pornography for profit” and was against its being shown at the festival.

Plot
Jan returns with his fiancée to his childhood home. While there he flashes back to his childhood, twenty years before when he lived an unfettered life watched over by a strange great-aunt and a hedonistic and often neglectful mother and father.

In particular he remembers watching his mother give birth to a stillborn child after refusing to go to the hospital in the middle of a party and his sexual obsession with his mother which included being caught by her while he was masturbating while listening to her read a bedtime story.

In the present, his relationship with his fiancée grows more strained as his past begins to affect the way he acts in the present.

Cast 
 Ingrid Thulin as Irene, the mother
 Keve Hjelm as Jan, as an adult
 Jörgen Lindström as Jan, age 12 
 Lena Brundin as Mariana
 Naima Wifstrand as Astrid
 Monica Zetterlund	as Lotten
 Lauritz Falk as Bruno
 Rune Lindström as Albin
 Christian Bratt as Erland
 Lissi Alandh as Melissa

References

External links
 

1966 films
1960s Swedish-language films
Swedish erotic drama films
1960s Swedish films